The Uilenburgergracht is a secondary canal in Amsterdam, the Netherlands. 
It is located east of the Amsterdam-Centrum district, in the Lastage neighborhood.

The Uilenburgergracht defines the southeastern border of Uilenburg Island. 
It is connected to Houtkopersburgwal and Rapenburgwal, which delimit the southwest and the northeast borders of the island.
They lead to the Oudeschans canal along the northwest of the island.

The Uilenburgergracht  was dug in 1593.
In the nineteenth century, the newly created islands of Uilenburg, Valkenburg and Marken were the poorest neighborhoods of the Jewish quarter.

See also 
Canals of Amsterdam

Notes

Sources

Canals in Amsterdam